Crimes of Passion is the second studio album by American singer Pat Benatar, released on August 5, 1980, by Chrysalis Records. It is Benatar's first album to feature Myron Grombacher on drums, beginning a long tenure in her band that would last into the late 1990s.

The album debuted on the US Billboard 200 for the week ending August 23, 1980, and held at number two for five weeks in January 1981, behind John Lennon and Yoko Ono's Double Fantasy.

Crimes of Passion contains the singles "Hit Me with Your Best Shot", which became Benatar's first top-10 entry in the US, and is considered to be her best-known song, and "Treat Me Right", a top-20 entry in the US. Neither song was very successful in other countries, aside from "Hit Me with Your Best Shot" reaching the top 40 in Australia.

The first single released from the album was "You Better Run", the music video for which was the second music video ever aired on MTV in 1981. It peaked at number 42 in the US, and New Zealand, and did not chart in Canada, although it rose to number 33 in Australia. Crimes of Passion also contains a cover of Kate Bush's "Wuthering Heights".

Crimes of Passion is Benatar's best-selling album, having been certified four-times Platinum (for shipments in excess of over four million copies) in the United States and five-times Platinum (for shipments of 500,000 copies) in Canada. It placed at number five on Billboard magazine's 1981 year-end album chart. It peaked at number two in Canada and number six in New Zealand. It was also Benatar's highest-peaking album to that point in Australia (number 16) and her first album to chart in Sweden (number 27).

In 1981, Crimes of Passion earned Benatar her first Grammy Award for Best Female Rock Vocal Performance. The album was reissued and remastered on Capitol Records in 2006.

Track listing

Personnel
Credits adapted from the liner notes of Crimes of Passion.

Musicians
 Pat Benatar – vocals, background vocals
 Neil Giraldo – lead and rhythm guitars, keyboards, background vocals
 Scott St. Clair Sheets – guitar
 Roger Capps – bass, background vocals
 Myron Grombacher – drums

Technical
 Keith Olsen – production, engineering
 Chris Minto – engineering
 Jo Hansch, Greg Fulginiti – mastering at Artisan Sound Recorders

Artwork
 Ria Lewerke-Shapiro – art direction, cover design
 Billy Bass – direction
 Leon LeCash – photographs

Charts

Weekly charts

Year-end charts

Certifications

References

1980 albums
Albums produced by Keith Olsen
Albums recorded at Sound City Studios
Chrysalis Records albums
Grammy Award for Best Female Rock Vocal Performance
Pat Benatar albums